The Islamic State of Iraq and the Levant, often abbreviated as "ISIL" and pronounced as such, is a militant Islamist terrorist group. It is also known as the Islamic State of Iraq and Syria or the Islamic State of Iraq and ash-Sham, abbreviated as "ISIS" (and pronounced the same as the ancient Egyptian goddess, Isis) or sometimes as just Islamic State "IS", which has caused name changes to distinguish other entities from the group.

Software
Version 0.3 of Linux distribution elementary OS, originally to be called Isis, was renamed Freya. (Freya is a Norse goddess.)

A mobile banking app previously known as ISIS changed its name to Softcard in 2014, stating "We have no desire to share a name with the Islamic State of Iraq and the Levant and our hearts go out to those affected by this violence".

In 2015, the University of Arkansas decided to rename its course registration system from "Integrated Student Information System" to "UAConnect".

Tufts University and University of Massachusetts Lowell renamed its online information system, iSiS, the "Intercampus Student information System", to "SiS" – Student Information System.

In 2016, the University of Economics, Prague decided to rename its online information system from ISIS to INSIS (Czech: Integrovaný Studijní Informační Systém).

Also in 2016, Cornell University's Isis2 Distributed Computing Library was renamed "Vsync" to eliminate any suggestion of connections to the group. 

Other universities that have renamed their software include Kansas State University and Johns Hopkins University.

Business
In 2013, a Belgian chocolate manufacturer previously known as Italo Suisse changed its name to ISIS. But in 2014, it changed the name again to Libeert after a decline in sales, mainly in the Anglophone world. The company was founded in 1923, and had only been called ISIS for a year.

A British private equity firm changed its name from ISIS Equity Partners to Livingbridge to distance itself from the group.

In 2014, a Chicago business owner renamed her store from ISIS to My Sister's Circus after people began taking pictures of her store's sign and harassing her sales staff.

In Queens, New York, the owner of ISIS Nails renamed the salon Bess Nails and Spa because of harassment. The salon's revenue had declined by approximately 30 percent.

In 2015, Isis Pharmaceuticals Inc., a pharmaceutical company in California, originally named for the Egyptian goddess, after observing relevant drop in stock and to avoid confusion, decided to change the name to Ionis Pharmaceuticals.

Automobile performance part manufacturer ISIS Performance changed its name to ISR Performance after using it for 6 years to remove the negative connotation with its name. The change took place on November 17, 2015.

The Danish dessert company ISIS changed their name to EASIS, citing the "political connotations" their name would have on primarily export markets.

An Australian fitout and refurbishment company changed its name to SHAPE, to coincide with the "best interests" of those involved with their business.

In June 2016, Finnish translation agency Isis Translations changed its name to Pauhu Ltd to avoid denial of service attacks and problems with bank and PayPal payments.

Organisations

In 2014, an organisation in the Canadian province of Nova Scotia aimed at assimilating immigrants, previously known as Immigrant Settlement & Integration Services (ISIS), changed its name to Immigrant Services Association of Nova Scotia (ISANS). Its main concern about the former name was its appropriateness towards clients from Iraq and Syria, where ISIL are operative.

A language school in Oxford, named Isis after the city's stretch of the River Thames, became the Oxford International Education Group in April 2015. Staff said that recruiting from the Middle East was made difficult by the name, and that people searching for their website may be put at risk.

In 2016, the Association for Information Systems (AIS) changed the pronunciation of its premier conference ICIS, International Conference on Information Systems, to "I See IS".

Entertainment
The FX animated series Archer, first aired in 2009, revolves around the fictional International Secret Intelligence Service (ISIS). In 2014, the sixth season of the show began with the characters being told that they now work for the CIA. Merchandise based on the fictional ISIS was withdrawn.

A French rock band changed their name from Isis Child to Angel's Whisper as the attention on ISIL had overshadowed them on search engines. An American band named Isis, which was disbanded in 2010, changed their Facebook name to "Isis the band" to avoid confusion. Some fans suggested that the band should change their name completely.

In December 2015, the name of the spaceship browser in the online multiplayer video game EVE Online was changed from "Interbus Ship Identification System" (ISIS) to "Ship Tree".

The anime series Infinite Stratos also sometimes sparked controversy, as its shortened name is "IS", which is sometimes confused with Islamic State.

In the multiplayer online battle arena video game Smite, developer Hi-Rez Studios renamed the playable goddess Isis to Eset, citing concerns of demonetization on video platforms.

Given names

An Australian woman who named her daughter Isis after the Egyptian goddess stated it caused a rift in her family because the name is "now synonymous with terrorism and evil". An American woman named Isis initiated an online petition for the media to stop referring to ISIL as ISIS.

In April 2015, the World Meteorological Organization removed Isis from its list for the 2016 Pacific hurricane season, replacing it with "Ivette".

In November 2015, a soldier with the Canadian Armed Forces initially refused to sign a participatory certificate for nine-year-old Isis Fernandes who was attending a school field trip. The soldier only agreed to sign after commenting to the girl that he thought her name was not real and a bad joke. The soldier subsequently apologized and was removed from signing certificates for children in future.

False attribution 
The British television series Downton Abbey featured a dog named Isis after the goddess, who became ill in the show around the same time as other entities sought to distance themselves from ISIL. Actor Hugh Bonneville repudiated claims that the dog was being killed off due to its name, saying "Anyone who genuinely believes the series five storyline (1924) involving the animal was a reaction to recent world news is a complete berk." ITV called the name an "unfortunate coincidence".

See also
Names of the Islamic State
The Isis, an alternative name for the River Thames
The Isis Magazine

References

Islamic State of Iraq and the Levant
Naming controversies